Jason Rich (born May 8, 1986) is an American professional basketball player who last played for Beşiktaş Emlakjet of the Basketbol Süper Ligi (BSL). He played collegiately for Florida State, until 2008.

Career
Rich played college basketball for Florida State. After graduating, he went to Italy to play for Pallacanestro Cantù. He then played in Israel with Maccabi Haifa and Hapoel Jerusalem. After half a season in Belgium with Telenet Oostende, on January 31, 2013 he returned to Italy and signed a deal until the end of the season with Vanoli Cremona. Rich immediately became the leader of the team and helped the team win nine of the last thirteen games of the season, remaining undefeated at home. In these 14 games he averaged 16.1 points, 3.4 rebounds and 2 assists. After a year in Russia with Enisey Krasnoyarsk, he returned to Vanoli Cremona, signing a one-year deal. In October 2014, he signed with Élan Chalon.

On July 1, 2017, Rich signed with Sidigas Avellino of the Italian LBA. He was named the LBA Most Valuable Player of the season, while also being the league's scoring champion. In the 2018 LBA Playoffs, Rich and Avellino were eliminated in the quarter-finals by Trento, losing 1–3.

He has signed with Turkish club Beşiktaş Sompo Japan on October 17, 2018. 

On October 24, 2019, he has signed with Gaziantep Basketbol of the Turkish Basketbol Süper Ligi (BSL). 

On June 29, 2020, he has signed with Pallacanestro Varese of the Italian Lega Basket Serie A, but decided to withdraw right after.

Rich returned to play in the season 2021–22 signing with the newly promoted Napoli Basket.

On October 21, 2022, he has signed with Beşiktaş Emlakjet of the Basketbol Süper Ligi (BSL) for a second stint.

References

External links 
Sports-Reference.com Profile
Legabasket.it Profile 

Living people
1986 births
American expatriate basketball people in Belgium
American expatriate basketball people in France
American expatriate basketball people in Israel
American expatriate basketball people in Italy
American expatriate basketball people in Russia
American expatriate basketball people in Turkey
American men's basketball players
Basketball players from Florida
BC Enisey players
BC Oostende players
Beşiktaş men's basketball players
Élan Chalon players
Florida State Seminoles men's basketball players
Gaziantep Basketbol players
Guards (basketball)
Hapoel Jerusalem B.C. players
Lega Basket Serie A players
Maccabi Haifa B.C. players
Metropolitans 92 players
Napoli Basket players
Pallacanestro Cantù players
Parade High School All-Americans (boys' basketball)
S.S. Felice Scandone players
Sportspeople from Pensacola, Florida
Vanoli Cremona players